Ottakkayyan is a 2007 Malayalam film by G. R. Indugopan starring Harisree Ashokan, Rani Babu, Ashokan, and Arun. This movie marks the debut of Harisree Ashokan in the lead role of a movie.

Synopsis 
Two members of different fundamentalist groups get trapped in a remote island on a midnight, after committing a murder. The island is connected to the main land only through a rail link, which is filled with rioting crowds. The young men comes into contact with the only inhabitants of the island, Ottakkayyan Vasu, his wife and father-in-law. From there the story develops into an unpredictable end.

Cast
 Harisree Ashokan as Ottakkayyan Vasu 
 Rani Babu as Vasu's Wife 
 Ashokan as Mr. B 
 Arun as Mr. A 
 T. G. Ravi as Kallathokku Kanaran 
 Machan Varghese as Vasu's Brother in law

Awards
Kerala State Awards 2007
 Acting – Special Jury Mention - T G Ravi
 Best Cinematography - M.J. Radhakrishnan
 Best Sound Recording - T. Krishnanunni

External links
 
 
 http://popcorn.oneindia.in/title/2490/ottakkayyan.html
 http://www.webindia123.com/movie/regional/preview/nov2007/ottakayan/index.htm

2000s Malayalam-language films
2007 films
2000s thriller drama films
2007 drama films